The Memphis Baptist and Normal Institute was a historically Black college founded in 1888 by Peter Howe of Illinois. It was one of the earliest private educational facilities for African Americans in Memphis. The date it changed name to Howe Institute is unknown, but it was before 1910. 

In 1902 Thomas O. Fuller, a prominent author, church and civil leader, and person for whom T.O. Fuller State Park was named, was named principal. The campus consisted of the original Howe Building, then an Industrial Shop, which gave space for the printing and sewing departments, and then a Teacher's College building, along with the Clara Howe Dormitory for girls. The Institute also did settlement work. In 1908 there were 12 faculty besides Reverend Fuller, and its departments were: Literary, Industrial (sewing, printing, basketry), Ministerial, Missionary Training, and Stenography and Typewriting.

The Howe Institute had no endowment and relied on support from tuitions and donations. In the Great Depression, declining support forced its closure. Howe sold its buildings and merged with LeMoyne College in 1937.

Notable alumni
 Richard Wright, American author of novels, short stories, poems, and non-fiction
Mordecai Wyatt Johnson, first black president of Howard University

References

External links 

 

Schools in Shelby County, Tennessee
African-American history of Tennessee
Buildings and structures in Shelby County, Tennessee
1888 establishments in Tennessee
1937 disestablishments in Tennessee